Davis Plantation is a historic plantation house located near Monticello, Fairfield County, South Carolina.  It was built about 1845, and is a  two-story, white frame Greek Revival style house.  It has a hipped roof and two mammoth chimneys. It features a gabled front portico supported by four square, paneled Doric order columns.  The house was built by James B. Davis, descendant of Revolutionary War Captain, James Kincaid, and an early pioneer in South Carolina agricultural development.

It was added to the National Register of Historic Places in 1971.

References

Plantation houses in South Carolina
Houses on the National Register of Historic Places in South Carolina
Greek Revival houses in South Carolina
Houses completed in 1845
Houses in Fairfield County, South Carolina
National Register of Historic Places in Fairfield County, South Carolina